Antennoseius is a genus of mites in the family Ascidae. As of 2021, it comprised 59 species mostly in subgenera Antennoseius (34 species) and Vitzthumia (19 species), as well as six species not assigned to a subgenus.

Description 
Females of Antennoseius have two distinct shields on their dorsal surface. On the ventral surface, there is a sternal shield (usually with three pairs of setae), an epigynial shield that is rounded posteriorly, and either an anal shield (with circum-anal setae) or a subtriangular ventrianal shield (bearing 1 or 2 pairs of setae in addition to the circum-anal setae).

The two subgenera can be distinguished by the presence (Vitzthumia) or absence (Antennoseius) of ambulacra and claws on the first leg pair. Additionally, some species of Vitzthumia have two distinct morphs, a free-living morph and a phoretic morph. The free-living morph has much of its soft body cuticle with microtubercles superimposed on striae and on the shields. The phoretic morph has generally smooth cuticle, and its sternal shield may be eroded posteriorly so that st3 (the third seta pair) is on soft cuticle instead of the shield.

Males are known for only a few species. In the male of Antennoseius perseus, the two dorsal shields are partially fused together, ventrally there is a sterno-genital shield (bearing 5 pairs of setae) and a ventrianal shield (bearing 7 pairs of setae in addition to the circum-anal setae), and each chelicera bears a spermatodactyl (structure used to transfer sperm to the female), among other differences.

Ecology 
Antennoseius occur in soil (especially soil that is moist), plant litter, salt marshes, moss, and nests of various animals (mice, birds and ants).

Adult females of this genus often attach phoretically to ground beetles for transport.

Diet has been studied for only a few species, but these mainly feed on small invertebrates including other mites, nematodes and insects.

Species
 Antennoseius arvensis Kaluz, 1994      
 Antennoseius boskopensis Ryke, 1962      
 Antennoseius bregetovae Chelebiev, 1984      
 Antennoseius calathi Fain, Noti & Dufrene, 1995      
 Antennoseius chirae Jordaan, Loots & Theron, 1987      
 Antennoseius dargomensis Barilo, 1987      
 Antennoseius davidovae Eidelberg, 1994      
 Antennoseius deyi Bhattacharyya, 1994      
 Antennoseius fecundus Berlese, 1916      
 Antennoseius garurensis Bhattacharyya, 1994      
 Antennoseius ghilarovi Balan, 1988      
 Antennoseius hyperboreus Nikolskij, 1988      
 Antennoseius janus Lindquist & Walter, 1989      
 Antennoseius koroljevae Chelebiev, 1984      
 Antennoseius kurumanensis Jordaan, Loots & Theron, 1987      
 Antennoseius lobochelus Halliday, Walter & Lindquist, 1998      
 Antennoseius longipalpus Barilo, 1987      
 Antennoseius longisetus Eidelberg, 2000      
 Antennoseius makarovae Eidelberg, 1994      
 Antennoseius maltzevi Eidelberg, 1994      
 Antennoseius matalini Eidelberg, 2001      
 Antennoseius matsjuki Eidelberg, 2001      
 Antennoseius multisetus Eidelberg, 2000      
 Antennoseius orientalis Bhattacharyya, Sanyal & Bhattacharya, 2003
 Antennoseius oudemansi (Thor, 1930)      
 Antennoseius ovaliscutalis Eidelberg, 2000      
 Antennoseius ranikhetensis Bhattacharyya, 1994      
 Antennoseius rugosus Masan, 1997      
 Antennoseius shcherbakae Balan, 1988      
 Antennoseius similis Eidelberg, 2001      
 Antennoseius sinicus Guo & Gu, 1997      
 Antennoseius ukrainicus Sklyar, 1994      
 Antennoseius vysotskajae Sklyar, 1994

Identification 

 Key to Chinese species
 Key to subgenus Vitzthumia

References

Ascidae